Hyalomis espia is a moth of the subfamily Arctiinae. It was described by Paul Dognin in 1897. It is found in Ecuador.

References

Euchromiina
Moths described in 1897